Ayyanar Veethi is a 2017 Tamil-language drama film directed by debutant Gipsy Rajkumar  in his directorial debut. The film stars Yuvan, newcomer Sara Setty, and Sinju Mohan in the lead roles with Ponvannan and Bhagyaraj in pivotal roles.

Cast 
Yuvan as Senthil
Sara Setty as Ayyanar's daughter
Sinju Mohan as Sastry's daughter
Ponvannan as Ayyanar
Bhagyaraj as Subramania Sastry
Senthilvel
Singampuli
Meera Krishnan
Singamuthu
Muthukaalai
 Nadodigal Raja
 Kovai Senthil

Production 
The film was announced to be a rural drama with Yuvan in the lead role and Ponvannan and Bhagyaraj in pivotal roles. Singer U. K. Murali makes his debut as a film composer with this film. Newcomer Sara Setty and Sinju Mohan, of Pulipaarvai fame, play the heroines, who are the daughters of the characters portrayed by Ponvannan and Bhagyraj, respectively. The film was shot in Rajapalayam. A twenty-seven foot tall statue of Ayyanar was created for the film.

Soundtrack
Soundtrack was composed by U. K. Murali.
"Vaararu Ayyan Varaaru" - Ananthu, M. L. R. Karthikeyan
"Ponnungale Poruthavare" - Jaya Moorthy 
"Kallapparvai" - Prasanna, Mahathy 
"Kannucharayam Munnale" - Velmurugan, Krithika Babu 
"Ayyanaaru Veedhiyile" - U. K. Murali, Gipsy Rajkumar 
"Anbukonda Ayyan Mugam" - U. K. Murali, Gipsy Rajkumar

Release 
The Times of India gave the film one out of five stars and wrote that "It (The film) unfolds like a collection of the worst elements of 80s and 90s melodramas". The Times of India Samayam gave the film a rating of one-and-half out of five stars praising the cinematography and criticizing the plot holes. Dinamalar praised the music while criticizing the background score and plot gaps. Maalaimalar praised the cinematgorphy and music and criticized the background score.

References

External links 
 

Indian drama films
2010s Tamil-language films
2017 drama films